Bengali input methods refer to different systems developed to type the characters of the Bengali script for Bengali language and others, using a typewriter or a computer keyboard.

Fixed computer layouts
With the advent of graphical user interfaces and word processing in the 1980s, a number of computer typing systems for Bengali were created. Most of these were originally based on Apple Macintosh systems.

Shahidlipi

Shahidlipi was the first Bengali keyboard developed for the computer by Saifuddahar Shahid in 1985. It was a phonetic based layout on QWERTY for Macintosh computer. This keyboard was popular until the release of Bijoy keyboard. There were about 182 characters and half part of conjunct characters under Normal, Shift, AltGr, and Shift AltGr layer.

Munier keyboard

Munier keyboard layout comes from a Bengali typewriter layout named Munier-Optima. In 1965, Munier Choudhury redesigned the keyboard of Bengali typewriter in collaboration with Remington typewriters of the then East Germany. Munier-Optima was the most used typewriter in Bangladesh. So, many software developers implemented this layout on their keyboard. This layout is optimized for Unicode by Ekushey.

UniJoy keyboard

UniJoy keyboard is standardize  by Ekushey for unicode. It was included in the m17n database by Kenichi Handa under the GNU Lesser General Public License on 7 December 2005 under the copyright of the National Institute of Advanced Industrial Science and Technology (AIST).

Bangla Jatiyo

Bangla Jatiyo Keyboard (National) layout developed by Bangladesh Computer Council. It is considered as standard layout and used as the official layout in Bangladesh.

In 2004, an initiative was taken to develop a national Bangla computer keyboard. The initiative was taken to solve the problem caused by the existence of multiple keyboards (such as Bijoy, Bashundhara, Munier, Borno, Lekhoni etc.) in Bangladesh during that period, to set a standard standard of Bengali keyboard. In view of this, the Bangladesh Computer Council completed the task of formulating the National Bangla Computer Keyboard by reviewing the various Bangla keyboards existing in the country. 

Following the review of Bangladesh Computer Council, BSTI declared the keyboard as the national standard for Bengali computer keyboard known as Bangladesh Standard BDS 1738:2004. Letters and symbols are arranged in total 4 levels in Jatiyo Bangla keyboard. The most frequently used letters, symbols and ligatures are arranged in the 1st and 2nd levels, while the less frequently used letters and symbols are placed in the 3rd and 4th levels.

Meanwhile, the National Committee on Standardization of Bengali Language in Information Technology felt the need to modernize the existing National Bengali Computer Keyboard. In view of this BCC carried out the modernization work and sent it to BSTI which was approved as BDS 1738:2018. Bangladesh Computer Council develops Windows and Linux software for national keyboard use.

In 2017, Bangladesh Computer Council revised the national keyboard layout and announced the most popular Bijoy keyboard layout as the national keyboard layout.

Bengali Inscript 

This keyboard layout is designed in order to type all the indic scripts with a uniform layout on computer. This layout is officially accepted by Microsoft Corporation and is provided by default in their Windows operating system. It is also available on macOS, alongside Bengali-Qwerty. This layout is mainly popular in India.

Probhat

Probhat is a free Unicode-based Bengali fixed layout. Probhat is included in almost all Linux OS(s). Its key mapping is similar to Phonetic pattern but typing method is fully Fixed.

Bijoy

Bijoy keyboard layout is a proprietary layout of Mustafa Jabbar. It is licensed under the Bangladesh Copyright Act 2005. Bijoy keyboard, with related software and fonts, was first published in December 1998 for Macintosh computer. Windows version of Bijoy Keyboard was first published in March 1993. The first version of Bijoy software was developed in India (possibly by an Indian programmer). Subsequent versions were developed in Bangladesh by Ananda Computers' team of developers including Munirul Abedin Pappana who worked for Bijoy 5.0, popularly known as Bijoy 2000.  Version 3.0 is the latest version of Bijoy layout. Bijoy keyboard was most widely used in Bangladesh until the release of Unicode-based Avro Keyboard. It has a different AltGr character and vowel sign input system with its software than the Unicode Standard. This ASCII-Unicode based Bengali input software and requires the purchase of a license to use on every computer.

Baishakhi

Baishakhi keyboard is developed by Society for Natural Language Technology Research (SNLTR). It is mainly used in Indian governmental work. This layout is available in most common Linux Distribution OS.

Uni Gitanjali

Gitanjali Keyboard is customized for Unicode compliant to Uni Gitanjali Keyboard by Society for Natural Language Technology Research (SNLTR). It is mainly used in Indian governmental work. This layout is available in most common Linux Distribution OS.

Disha

Disha keyboard is based on Probhat layout and created by Sayak Sarkar. This layout is available the m17n database as proposed by Ankur Group. This keyboard aims to create a visual typing method for Bengali.

Phonetic computer layouts

Akkhor
Akkhor pronounced ôkkhôr Bangla Software, developed by Khan Md. Anwarus Salam, was first released on 1 January 2003 for free. The Unicode/ANSI-based Akkhor Keyboard is compatible with fixed keyboard layouts, including the Bijoy keyboard. Akkhor also provides a customization feature for designing fixed keyboard layouts. It provides a Keyboard Manager which works system wide and also provides an independent Akkhor Word processor.

Avro

Avro Keyboard, developed by Mehdi Hasan Khan, was first released on 26 March 2003 for free. It facilitates both fixed and phonetic layouts. Avro phonetic allows a user to write Bengali by typing the phonetic formation of the words in English language keyboards. Avro is available as a native IME on Microsoft Windows, macOS and Linux distributions. It was built-in Bengali IM in Firefox OS.

Bakkhor

Bakkhor (portmanteau of বাংলায় সাক্ষর, meaning Bengali literacy) Developed by Ensel Software and available online. It is an open-source JavaScript based. It allows some letters to be typed in multiple ways in order to type using lower case letters only in mobile devices.

Google Bengali Transliteration
There is a free transliteration web site and software package for Bengali scripts from google.

Microsoft Bengali transliteration
Along with other Indic languages, Microsoft has web based and desktop transliteration support for Bengali.

Bangla Onkur
Bangla Onkur pronounced onkur, developed by S. M. Raiyan Kabir, was first released on 30 March 2011 as an open-source software. It facilitates only phonetic typing in Macintosh platform. Bangla Onkur phonetic allows a user to write Bengali by typing the phonetic formation of the words in English language keyboards. This is the first phonetic input method developed for Mac OS X.

Saon Bengali
This is an m17n library which provides the Saon Bengali input method for touch typing in Bengali on Linux systems and the project was registered by its creator, Saoni at SourceForge on 8 July 2012. This free and open source IM is  Unicode 6.1 compliant in terms of both normalization and number of keystrokes used to input a single character. Saon Bengali enables touch typing so if a user can type in English, they won't have to look at the keyboard to type in Saon Bengali. It is also phonetic and has something in common with all Bengali phonetic layouts making the transition smooth for new users. As of Jul 2012 it not yet a part of the m17n-contrib which allows installation of all m17n contribbed libraries through Linux's software channels and it may be too early to say whether it will be incorporated. This depends firstly on its author and then if it is offered to m17n then probably on m17n. The m17n IM engine currently works with IBus inter alia on Linux. The copyright notice on Saon says, "You can redistribute this and/or modify it under the GNU LGPL 2.1 or later"

Open Bangla Keyboard 
Open Bangla Keyboard is an open source, Unicode compliant, Bangla input method for Linux systems. It's a full-fledged Bangla input method with many famous typing methods and typing automation tools.

OpenBangla Keyboard comes with the popular Avro Phonetic which is the de facto phonetic transliteration method for writing Bangla. It also includes multiple fixed keyboard layouts such as Probhat, Munir Optima, National (Jatiya) etc. which are very popular amongst the professional writers.

Most features of Avro Keyboard are present in OpenBangla Keyboard. So Avro Keyboard users will feel right at home in Linux with OpenBangla Keyboard.

Borno 

Borno (Bengali: বর্ণ) is a free Bengali input method editor developed by Jayed Ahsan. Borno is compatible with the latest version of Unicode and all versions of Windows OS. It was first released on 9 November 2018.

Borno supports both fixed and phonetic keyboard layouts. It supports both ANSI and Unicode.

Mobile phone layouts

There is also software for users for typing Bengali on mobile phones and smartphones.

Ridmik Keyboard

Ridmik Keyboard, is the input system available for Andoid and iOS. Users can type in Bengali with Avro Phonetic, Probhat, National and as well as English layouts. It also comes with many Emojis and background themes and have handy shortcuts and speech-to-text support using Google STT backend.

OpenBoard

OpenBoard is a free and open source keyboard based on AOSP which includes Bengali Layouts. It comes with three Bengali Fixed Layouts including Akkhor Layout. OpenBoard is a privacy focused keyboard which does not contain shortcuts to any Google apps, has no communication with Google servers. It supports Auto Correction, Word Suggestion for Bengali Language.

Indic Keyboard

Indic Keyboard is a free and open-source keyboard software for Android developed by Indic Project, available under Apache License. It supports common Bengali layouts, namely Probhat,  Avro and Inscript.

Bijoy

Bijoy Keyboard or Bijoy Bangla is a mobile keyboard for Android and iOS. But in 2015 they released it again and name it Bijoy Bangla only for Android. Bijoy Bangla is for writing Bangla in Unicode System with Bijoy Keyboard. It use the Bijoy layout which is almost same as Jatiyo layout. Users can type in Bengali and English using this keyboard.

Parboti

In Parboti Keyboard Users can type in Bengali and English using this keyboard. Also users can edit fixed layout by their own choice.

Mayabi

Mayabi Bangla Keyboard is an on-screen Bengali soft keyboard for Android platform. Bengali word dictionary included with the keyboard as well for word prediction.

Google Indic Keyboard

Google Indic Keyboard is an Android keyboard that supports several Indic languages, including Bengali. It offers a handwriting input method and a Latin letter transliteration layout, as well as a traditional Bengali keyboard.

Borno Keyboard

Borno is the first open-source Bangla input method editor for Android, maintained and developed by Jayed Ahsan. It's licensed under GPL 3.0. It also comes with both phonetic and fixed keyboard layouts, an option for adding PC QWERTY layout is also present. It also features horizontal emojis.

Borno is the first glide typing supported Bangla keyboard of Bangladesh. It's still under development.

See also
 Japanese input methods

References

External links

Bengali language
Input methods
Indic computing